Emre Yıldırım (born 1 January 2002) is a professional footballer who plays as a defender for Gümüşhanespor on loan from Denizlispor. Born in Turkey, he represents Azerbaijan internationally.

Professional career
Yıldırım is a youth product of Sarayköy 1926 and Denizlispor, and signed his first professional contract with Denizlispor in January 2021. He made his professional debut with Denizlispor in a 5–1 Süper Lig loss to Fatih Karagümrük on 15 March 2021.

International career
Yıldırım was called up to a camp for the Turkey U16s in March 2018. He represented the Azerbaijan U19s in a pair of friendlies in October 2020.

References

External links
 
 

2002 births
Sportspeople from Denizli
Turkish people of Azerbaijani descent
Living people
Azerbaijani footballers
Azerbaijan youth international footballers
Turkish footballers
Association football defenders
Denizlispor footballers
Tepecikspor footballers
Gümüşhanespor footballers
Süper Lig players
TFF First League players
TFF Third League players